Nikolayevka is a rural locality (a selo) and the administrative center of Nikolayevsky Selsoviet, Mikhaylovsky District, Altai Krai, Russia. The population was 925 as of 2013. There are 9 streets.

Geography 
Nikolayevka is located 27 km northwest of Mikhaylovskoye (the district's administrative centre) by road. Bastan is the nearest rural locality.

References 

Rural localities in Mikhaylovsky District, Altai Krai